Jantunen is a Finnish surname. Notable people with the surname include:

Arvo Jantunen (1929–2018), Finnish basketball player and coach
Heli Jantunen (born 1958), Finnish electrical engineer researching electroceramics for telecommunications
Marko Jantunen (born 1971), Finnish ice hockey player
Pertti Jantunen (born 1952), Finnish footballer and manager

Finnish-language surnames